Adeona (minor planet designation: 145 Adeona) is a large asteroid from the intermediate asteroid belt, approximately  in diameter. Its surface is very dark, and, based upon its classification as a C-type asteroid, is probably composed of primitive carbonaceous material. The spectra of the asteroid displays evidence of aqueous alteration. The Adeona family of asteroids is named after it.

It was discovered by C. H. F. Peters on June 3, 1875, from the observatory at Hamilton College, Clinton, New York. Peters named it after Adeona, the Roman goddess of homecoming, because he had recently returned from a journey across the world to observe the transit of Venus. Peters also discovered 144 Vibilia on the same night.

During 2001, Adeona was observed by radar from the Arecibo Observatory. The returned signal matched an effective diameter of 151 ± 18 km. This is consistent with the asteroid dimensions computed through other means.

Two stellar occultations by Adeona have been observed: The first one on July 9, 2002 when it occulted an 11.8 mag star, and then again on February 3, 2005 when several observers in Japan recorded the occultation of a 10.4 mag star. The latter was consistent with a diameter of 151 km.

The Dawn mission team discussed performing a flyby of this object, however NASA decided against it in July 2016. At the time this was considered Dawn was orbiting the large asteroid/dwarf planet 1 Ceres, and went on studying that body later that year. Dawn had previously orbited asteroid 4 Vesta, before traveling to Ceres.

See also 
 List of minor planets formerly targeted for spacecraft visitation

References

External links 
 
 

000145
Discoveries by Christian Peters
Named minor planets
000145
000145
000145
18750603